Elm Center is an unincorporated community in Putnam County, in the U.S. state of Ohio.

History
Elm Center had its start as a station on the railroad. A post office called Elm Center was established in 1887, and remained in operation until 1903.

References

Unincorporated communities in Putnam County, Ohio
Unincorporated communities in Ohio